Kilian Stobæus (6 February 1690 – 17 February 1742) was a Swedish physician, natural scientist, and historian. He offered a young Carl Linnaeus tutoring and lodging, as well as the use of his library, which included many books about botany. He also gave the student free admission to his lectures. In his spare time, Linnaeus explored the flora of Scania together with students sharing the same interests.

Life 
Stobæus was born 6 February 1690 in Vinslöv, Sweden. He was the son of Nils Stobæus and nephew of professor . Although he was born in the province of Scania, Stobæus grew up with an uncle in Gothenburg. In 1725 he married Florentina Schubert, the daughter of a hat maker in Lund. Stobæus died 17 February 1742 in Lund.

Medical career 
In 1709 he became a student at Lund University, where he was promoted to doctor of medicine in 1721. Johan Jacob Döbelius was his mentor there. In December of the same year he was appointed to lead Döbelius' professorship, which he did until the end of 1723. In 1724 he became city physician in Gothenburg, but the following year he returned to Lund at the request of the Scanian nobility and the magistrate in Malmö and on the guarantee of an annual fee. As a doctor he provided free medication to the ill and poor.

Academic work 

He was also given the title of archiater the same year, and he continued to practice medicine extensively during his time as professor of history, including as doctor at the Ramlösa mineral spa, and tutoring young physicians.

He was not only, from the scientific point of view of his time, an excellent physician and scientist, but also distinguished himself personally by his rectitude and seriousness. Stobæus knew very well how to arouse in his disciples a desire for scientific work by approaching them personally and showing them the paths of study and research. In his private residence in Lund, he provided free accommodation for a large number of promising students, including the young Carl Linnaeus, who was granted free access to Stobæus' impressive private library. Among Stobæus' other students and disciples were Nils Rosén von Rosenstein,  and Sven Lagerbring.

Research 
In the natural sciences, Stobæus was particularly interested in the study of fossils. In the field of history, his activities were significant, especially in the broader direction he introduced in his teaching, in that he not only addressed ancient and general history, as his predecessors had done, but also lectured on Swedish history and gave instruction in source research, on ancient monuments, and in numismatics. In 1735 he donated his considerable collections of natural objects and archaeological objects to Lund University, thereby laying the foundations not only for its natural history museum (which for a long time bore the name Museum Stobaænum, and which developed into the ), but also for its archaeological collections (now the ). In 1745 his wife donated his numismatic collection to Lund University.

Authorship 
Stobæus published a large number of scientific publications, partly in the form of dissertations, partly in the series . The most important of these were collected and reprinted in 1752–1753 in Danzig under the title . In addition, several unprinted writings by Stobæus are kept in the Lund University Library.

Student nation activity 
As a student, Stobæus had belonged to the student nation  and was also its  in 1717.

In 1906, a bust of Stobæus (sculpted by Walter Runeberg) was erected on the university square in Lund. This now forms, every year on the first of May, the meeting point for a student society, the Kilian & C:o Orden. One of the sons of Stobæus' cousin, by the same name –  (1717–1792) – also became a professor in Lund in obstetrics.

References

External links

1690 births
1742 deaths
Academic staff of Lund University
People from Hässleholm Municipality
18th-century Swedish physicians